Pleasant Lake is an unincorporated community in Steuben Township, Steuben County, in the U.S. state of Indiana.

History
Pleasant Lake was originally called Nipcondish, which means "pleasant waters." The town is named after the lake which is the focus of the town.

The Pleasant Lake post office has been in operation since 1851.

Geography

References

Unincorporated communities in Steuben County, Indiana
Unincorporated communities in Indiana